Giovanni "Nello" Pazzafini (15 May 1933 – 9 January 1996) was an Italian actor who appeared in a very large number of Peplum movies, Spaghetti Westerns  and Poliziotteschi.

Life and career
Born in Rome from parents originally from Ferrara, at young age Pazzafini was a footballer and in 1958 he attended the first school for stunt men opened in Italy. Initially an often uncredited stunt performer in peplum films, starting from mid-1960s he gradually got bigger roles, specializing in villain characters.

Partial filmography
 The Trojan Horse (1961)
 The Triumph of Robin Hood (1962)
 Hercules and the Black Pirates (1964)
 3 Avengers (1964)
 Wanted (1967)
 7 pistole per un massacro (1967)
 Run, Man, Run (1968)
 Bootleggers (1969)
 They Call Him Cemetery (1971)
 Blood and Bullets (1976)
 The Mafia Triangle (1981)
 Double Trouble (1984)

References

External links

1933 births
1996 deaths
Italian male film actors
Male Spaghetti Western actors
20th-century Italian male actors